Denis O'Riordan (born 1941) is an Irish former hurler who played as a centre-back and full back at senior level for the Cork county team.

Career
Born in Ballincollig, County Cork, He started his sporting career as a minor with Ballincollig and senior with Muskerry (divisional Club). He subsequently moved to the Glen Rovers in 1958. 
O'Riordan first arrived on the inter-county scene at the young age of seventeen when he first linked up with the Cork minor team. He made his senior debut during the 1960 championship. O'Riordan immediately became a regular member of the starting fifteen and won one Munster medal in 1966 in Limerick. This cork team went on to win the 1966 All Ireland senior hurling championship on the second Sunday of September.

As a member of the Munster inter-provincial team on a number of occasions, O'Riordan won three Railway Cup medal. At club level he has two All-Ireland medallist with Glen Rovers. In addition to this he has also won two Munster medal and five championship medals. He began his career with Ballincollig and following his senior debut for muskerry he moved to Glen Rovers and played Gaelic football with St. Nicholas' and has 2 county senior football medals.

He holds the crown of Corks first Cú Chulainn Award holder (Pre all stars) in 1965 and captained cork in  1967. 
Throughout his career O Riordan made over 20 championship appearances including the infamous match in newross.  His county retirement came following the conclusion of the 1969 championship but played for the Glen until 1970.

Honours

Glen Rovers
All-Ireland Senior Club Hurling Championship: 1973
Munster Senior Club Hurling Championship: 1964, 1972
Cork Senior Hurling Championship: 1962, 1964, 1967, 1969, 1972

Cork
All-Ireland Senior Hurling Championship: 1966
Munster Senior Hurling Championship: 1966

References

1941 births
Living people
Ballincollig hurlers
Cork inter-county hurlers
Glen Rovers hurlers
Munster inter-provincial hurlers
St Nicholas' Gaelic footballers